Riverside Amusement Park may refer to:
Riverside Amusement Park (Massachusetts), former name (1840-2000) of Six Flags New England in Agawam, Massachusetts
Riverside Amusement Park (Austin), Texas 
Riverside Amusement Park (Binghamton), New York
Riverside Amusement Park (Chicago), Illinois
Riverside Amusement Park (Estes Park), Colorado (1923-1970)  
Riverside Amusement Park (Hutchinson), Kansas (1908-early 1930s)
Riverside Amusement Park (Indianapolis), Indiana (1903-1970)
Riverside Amusement Park (Joplin), Missouri
Riverside Amusement Park (La Crosse), Wisconsin (1990-present)
Riverside Amusement Park (Louisville), Kentucky
Riverside Amusement Park (Medicine Hat), Alberta
Riverside Amusement Park (Phoenix), Arizona
Riverside Amusement Park (Stourport-on-Severn), Worcestershire (2000-present)

See also

Riverside Park (disambiguation)
Riverview Park (disambiguation)